Robert Ebendorf (born September 30, 1938) is an American metalsmith and jeweler, known for craft, art and studio jewelry, often using found objects. In 2003–2004, the Smithsonian American Art Museum organized an exhibition of 95 pieces, titled The Jewelry of Robert Ebendorf: A Retrospective of Forty Years.

Biography 
Born on September 30, 1938, in Topeka, Kansas, the son of Dr. Harry Ebendorf and Nomah Large, a homemaker. Starting at a young age, his father would take him to his paternal grandparent's tailor shop. There he would watch them work together, creating articles of clothing. He credits the time spent there, and his mother, with helping create his sensitivity to the world around him and leading him to choose a career in art.

Academics challenged Ebendorf due to a learning disability, dyslexia. However he excelled at sports, and was offered full scholarships for wrestling and football. With the encouragement of his high school art teacher, he instead decided to pursue art and chose to attend the University of Kansas where he received a Bachelor of Fine Arts degree in 1960, and a Master of Fine Arts degree in 1963. He was influenced by the jewelry designed by Irena Brynner and by Scandinavian art.
 
After graduation, Ebendorf received a Fulbright Scholar Grant to study abroad at the State School of Applied Arts and Crafts in Oslo, Norway. He returned to Norway again in 1965 when he was awarded a Louis Comfort Tiffany Foundation grant. He stayed there until 1966, working in Fredikstad at Norway Silver Designs.

From 1967 until 1971, Ebendorf taught at the University of Georgia. Starting in 1970, Ebendorf joined Kurt Matzdorf in the metals department at State University of New York at New Paltz (SUNY New Paltz), where he remained until 1988.

In 1999, he was named the Carol Grotnes Belk Distinguished Professor of Art at the East Carolina University School of Art and Design. and is a board member of the National Endowment for the Arts.

Recognition 
The Smithsonian exhibition was held in the Renwick Gallery and traveled to other museums. Ebendorf's work has been published extensively, and displayed in galleries around the world.

In addition to the Fulbright Scholarship and Louis Comfort Tiffany Grant, Ebendorf has received a National Endowment for the Arts Award, and American Crafts Council Award, and in 2005 was named a Master of the Medium by the Renwick Alliance. In 2014, Ebendorf was given the Society of North American Goldsmith's Lifetime Achievement Award

The Smithsonian American Art Museum has four, the Metropolitan Museum has five, the Asheville Art Museum has two, and the Museum of Arts and Design has two Ebendorf pieces in their permanent collections.

Notes

External links
A Creative Excuse podcast interview with Bob Ebendorf, May 2019 - https://hechoamano.org/bob-ebendorf
Smithsonian Archives of American Art Interview with Robert Ebendorf conducted by Tracey Rosolowski - http://www.aaa.si.edu/collections/oralhistories/transcripts/ebendo04.htm
Video of Ebendorf leading a jewelry making workshop at Bear Canyon School of Art and Craft. Uploaded Dec 2010 - https://www.youtube.com/watch?v=I3BSgdAwD6E
East Carolina University "Art's Thread" Student Program, guest Robert Ebendorf, uploaded Nov 2008 - https://www.youtube.com/watch?v=oL9f9idLKtM
North Carolina Arts Council - Video Interview of Bob Ebendorf, Uploaded Nov 2009 - https://www.youtube.com/watch?v=L0nj58QUPTE

1938 births
Living people
East Carolina University faculty
American jewellers
University of Kansas alumni
Artists from Topeka, Kansas